Taxodiomyia cupressiananassa, the cypress twig gall midge, is a species of gall midges, insects in the family Cecidomyiidae.

References

External links

 Diptera.info

Cecidomyiinae
Taxa named by Carl Robert Osten-Sacken
Gall-inducing insects